Ted Saunders may refer to:

Ted Saunders (musician), on Living Time
Ted Saunders (ice hockey)
Ted Saunders, character in Akeelah and the Bee played by Craig Wasson

See also
Edward Saunders (disambiguation)
Theodore Saunders, musician